There are more than 2000 species of fauna that can be found in Tamil Nadu. This rich wildlife is attributed to the diverse relief features as well as favorable climate and vegetation in the Indian state. Recognizing the state's role in preserving the current environment, the state government has established several wildlife and bird sanctuaries as well as national parks, which entail stringent protective measures. Tamil Nadu is also included in the International Network of Biosphere Reserves, which facilitates international recognition and additional funding. There are five national parks and 17 sanctuaries that serve as homes to the wildlife.

Mammals

Tamil Nadu is known for the diversity of its mammals due to the varying environs that sustain both dry and moist deciduous forests. Notable species include Arboreal animals distributed in its hills, grasslands, mangroves, scrubs and forests. These also include vulnerable species like the Bengal tiger, Nilgiri Tahr, and the lion-tailed macaque.

Other mammals found in Tamil Nadu include:
 
Bengal tiger
Asian elephant
Indian leopard
sloth bear
gaur
Manjampatti white bison
wild boar
lion-tailed macaque
Nilgiri langur
gray langur
bonnet macaque
four-horned antelope
dhole
honey badger 
tree shrew
sambar deer
mouse deer
Indian muntjac
jungle cat
leopard cat
small Indian civet
Asian palm civet
small Indian mongoose
blackbuck
chital
Nilgiri marten
Travancore flying squirrel
grizzled giant squirrel
Indian giant flying squirrel
Indian palm squirrel
black-naped hare
grey slender loris
Indian pangolin
Malabar spiny dormouse
Bengal fox
smooth-coated otter
Asian small-clawed otter
bare-bellied hedgehog
Indian crested porcupine

Birds

 
Birds found in Tamil Nadu include:
 

Malabar trogon 
Malabar pied hornbill 
Nilgiri Wood-pigeon 
Nilgiri laughing thrush 
peregrine falcon 
Bonelli's eagle 
dollarbird 
Nilgiri pipit 
little spiderhunter 
white-bellied shortwing 
little ringed plover 
Indian swiftlet 
white-bellied treepie 
white-bellied woodpecker
green imperial pigeon 
Nilgiri flycatcher 
great eared nightjar 
grey junglefowl 
heart-spotted woodpecker 
peafowl 
grey-fronted green pigeon 
wood sandpiper 
vernal hanging parrot 
Malabar parakeet 
white-browed bulbul 
stork-billed kingfisher 
grey-headed fish-eagle 
brown-capped pygmy woodpecker 
black-and-orange flycatcher 
brown-headed barbet 
blue-bearded bee-eater 
broad-tailed grassbird 
cormorant 
darter 
heron 
egret 
open-billed stork 
spoonbill 
white ibis 
little grebe 
Indian moorhen 
black-winged stilt

There are also a few migratory ducks and occasionally a grey pelican.

Marine species

Marine species include the dugong, turtle, dolphin and Balanoglossus.

Insects
Butterfly species found in Tamil Nadu include:

southern birdwing
common rose
crimson rose
common bluebottle
common jay
tailed jay
spot swordtail
five-bar swordtail
common mime
Malabar banded swallowtail
Malabar raven
red Helen
common Mormon
blue Mormon
paris peacock
Malabar banded peacock
common banded peacock
common emigrant
mottled emigrant
small grass yellow
common grass yellow
common Jezebel
Psyche butterfly
common gull
lesser gull
caper white
plain puffin
chocolate albatross
common albatross
lesser albatross
small orange tip
white orange tip
yellow orange tip
common wanderer
great orange tip
tawny coaster

Reptiles

Reptilian species found in Tamil Nadu include:

Mugger crocodile
king cobra
bamboo pit viper
Indian cobra
Indian python
Travancore tortoise
spectacled cobra
common krait
common green whip snake
Russell's kukri
common Indian monitor
Indian chameleon
Oriental garden lizard
South Indian flying lizard
olive ridley turtle
Cochin forest cane turtle
Indian black turtle
Russell's viper

There are also various species of skinks and geckos.

Amphibians

Amphibian species include:
 Large wrinkled frog
 Malabar black narrow mouthed frog 
 Kerala warty frog
 pigmy wrinkled frog
 burrowing frog

References

 Government of Tamil Nadu, Department of Environment, State of Environment Report - 2005, Biodiversity  Chapt. 11.2 Tamil Nadu's Biodiversity

Tamil Nadu
Environment of Tamil Nadu
Tourism in Tamil Nadu